Short Stories is the seventeenth studio album by American country music group The Statler Brothers. It was released in 1977 via Mercury Records. The album peaked at number 21 on the Billboard Top Country Albums chart.

Track listing
"Silver Medals and Sweet Memories" (Don Reid) – 2:30
"The Regular Saturday Night Setback Card Game" (D. Reid, Harold Reid) – 2:52
"That Summer" (D. Reid) – 2:54
"He Went to the Cross Loving You" (D. Reid, H. Reid) – 2:36
"Quite a Long, Long Time" (Lew DeWitt) – 2:30
"Carried Away" (DeWitt) – 2:22
"The Star" (D. Reid) – 3:26
"Grandma" (D. Reid) – 2:58
"Different Things to Different People" (D. Reid) – 2:52
"Give My Love to Rose" (Johnny Cash) – 3:10
"Some I Wrote" (D. Reid, H. Reid) - 2:20

Chart performance

References

1977 albums
The Statler Brothers albums
Mercury Records albums
Albums produced by Jerry Kennedy